Jerome Henry "Jerry" Brudos (January 31, 1939 – March 28, 2006) was an American serial killer and necrophile who murdered at least four women in Oregon between 1968 and 1969.

Early life
Jerry Brudos was born in Webster, South Dakota, as the younger of two sons. His mother had wanted a girl and was very displeased that she had another son instead, and constantly subjected him to emotional and physical abuse. As a child, Brudos and his family would move into different homes in the Pacific Northwest, before settling in Salem, Oregon.

Brudos had a fetish for women's shoes from the age of five, after playing with stiletto heeled shoes at a local junkyard. He reportedly attempted to steal the shoes of his first grade teacher. Brudos also had a fetish for women's underwear and claimed that he would steal underwear from female neighbors as a child. He spent his teen years in and out of psychotherapy and psychiatric hospitals.

In his teenaged years, Brudos began to stalk local women, knocking them down or choking them unconscious, and fleeing with their shoes. At age 17, he abducted and beat a young woman, threatening to stab her if she did not follow his sexual demands. Shortly after being arrested, he was taken to a psychiatric ward of Oregon State Hospital for nine months. There it was found Brudos' sexual fantasies revolved around his hatred towards his mother and women in general. He underwent a psychiatric evaluation and was diagnosed with schizophrenia. Despite being institutionalized, Brudos graduated from high school with his class in 1957. Shortly after graduation, he became an electronics technician.

In 1961, Brudos married a 17-year-old girl with whom he would father two children, and settled in a Salem suburb. He asked his new bride to do housework naked except for a pair of high heels while he took pictures. It was at about this time that he began complaining of migraine headaches and "blackouts," relieving his symptoms with night-prowling raids to steal shoes and lace undergarments. Brudos would experience a transvestite period, where he used the female persona as a form of escape mechanism. Brudos kept the shoes, underwear, and (for a time) the bodies of his victims in a garage that he would not allow his wife to enter without first announcing her arrival on an intercom that he had set up.

Murders and incarceration
Between 1968 and 1969, Brudos bludgeoned and strangled four young women and attempted to attack two others:

 Linda Slawson, 19, a door-to-door encyclopedia saleswoman who knocked on Brudos's door on January 26, 1968. Brudos lured her to the basement while his wife and children were in the house, knocked her out with a wooden plank, and strangled her. He dressed her in different female undergarments and shoes he had stolen, arranged her body in provocative poses, and used a hacksaw to cut off her left foot, which he kept in a freezer and used to model his collection of high-heel shoes. He disposed of the body in the Willamette River.
 Jan Susan Whitney, 23, a motorist whose car broke down on Interstate 5 between Salem and Albany on November 26, 1968. Brudos offered to drive her to his home with the excuse of letting her call a tow truck there. While still in the car, he strangled her with a leather strap and raped her. He kept the body hanging from the pulley in his garage for several days, during which he dressed, photographed, and had sex with it. This time, Brudos cut off one of her breasts and made a resin mold of it that he used as a paperweight. Afterward he tied the body to a piece of railroad iron and threw it in the Willamette along with Slawson's foot, which had rotted.
 Karen Sprinker, 18, abducted at gunpoint from a parking lot outside a department store on March 27, 1969. Brudos was dressed in women's clothes during this attack. He took her to his garage, made her try on his collection of undergarments and pose while he photographed her, raped her, and strangled her by hanging her by her neck from a pulley. Brudos had sex with the body on several occasions and cut off her breasts to make plastic molds. Afterward, he tied the body to a six-cylinder car engine with nylon cord and threw it in the Willamette.
 Sharon Wood, 24, attempted to abduct at gunpoint from the basement floor of a parking garage in Portland on April 21, 1969.
 Gloria Gene Smith, 15, attempted to abduct on April 22, 1969.
 Linda Salee, 22, abducted from a shopping mall parking lot on April 23, 1969. Brudos brought her to his garage where he raped and strangled her, and played with her corpse. He decided to not cut her breasts off because they were "too pink," and instead applied an electrical current to the body in an attempt to make it "jump", which failed. Afterward, he tied the body to a car transmission with a nylon cord and threw it in the Willamette.

Brudos would dress up in high heels and masturbate after committing a murder. In May 1969, a fisherman found the bodies of Salee and Sprinker in the Long Tom River. The police asked students at a nearby university campus about suspicious men and one led them to Brudos, who had phoned her several times to ask her for a date. Brudos gave police a false address, which increased their suspicions. At his garage, the police found copper wire that was determined to have been cut with the same tool that cut the cords used to tie the bodies. Brudos was arrested, and he made a full confession.

On June 28, 1969, Brudos pled guilty to three first-degree murders (Sprinker, Whitney and Salee) and was sentenced to three consecutive terms of life imprisonment in Oregon State Penitentiary. Though he confessed to Slawson's murder, Brudos was neither tried nor convicted for it because he did not make and keep photographs of the body, unlike in the other cases, but only of her foot. Whitney's body was found a month after Brudos' conviction, about a mile downstream from where he said he had thrown it.

While incarcerated, Brudos had piles of women's shoe catalogues in his cell. He wrote to major companies requesting them, and claimed they were his substitute for pornography. He lodged countless appeals, including one in which he alleged that a photograph taken of him with one of his victim's corpses could not prove his guilt, because it was not the body of a person he was convicted of killing. In 1995, the parole board told Brudos that he would never be released.

Psychiatrist Michael H. Stone identifies Brudos as having a psychopathic personality, noting his callousness and lack of remorse for his crimes. Marion County detective Jim Byrnes recalled a conversation with Brudos in which he asked him "do you feel some remorse, Jerry? Do you feel sorry for your victims, for the girls who died?" Brudos then picked a half-piece of paper up off of the table, wadded it up into a ball and threw it on the floor, whereupon he replied "I care about those girls as much as I care about that piece of wadded up paper."

Illness and death
Brudos died in prison on March 28, 2006, from liver cancer. At the time of his death, he was the longest incarcerated inmate in the Oregon Department of Corrections (a total of 37 years, from 1969 to 2006).

Popular culture
 Brudos is portrayed by actor Happy Anderson in the Netflix original series Mindhunter in Season 1, episodes 7 and 8.
 Actor Ted Levine based part of his performance as serial killer Jame "Buffalo Bill" Gumb in The Silence of the Lambs on Brudos.
 The American extreme metal band Macabre has a song about Brudos on their 2003 album, Murder Metal the song is titled Fatal Foot Fetish.
 J. K. Rowling has stated that the serial killer in her novel Troubled Blood was, in part, based on Brudos.

See also 
 List of serial killers in the United States

Bibliography

References

1939 births
1968 murders in the United States
2006 deaths
20th-century American criminals
American male criminals
American people convicted of murder
American people of Norwegian descent
American people who died in prison custody
American prisoners sentenced to life imprisonment
American rapists
American serial killers
Crimes in Oregon
Criminals from South Dakota
Deaths from cancer in Oregon
Deaths from liver cancer
Human trophy collecting
Male serial killers
Murder convictions without a body
Necrophiles
People convicted of murder by Oregon
People from Webster, South Dakota
People from Salem, Oregon
People with antisocial personality disorder
People with schizophrenia
Prisoners sentenced to life imprisonment by Oregon
Prisoners who died in Oregon detention
Serial killers who died in prison custody
Violence against women in the United States